The Emerald River is a short river in British Columbia. It picks up three named tributaries; Hamilton Creek, Russell Creek and Kendel Creek.

The name of the river was adopted in the 5th Report of the Geographic Board of Canada, 30 June 1904.

See also
List of British Columbia rivers

References 

Rivers of British Columbia
Rivers of the Canadian Rockies
Yoho National Park
Kootenay Land District